"Where Do We Go from Here" is a single by Canadian country music artist Hank Smith. The song debuted at number 48 on the RPM Country Tracks chart on September 4, 1971. It peaked at number 1 on November 27, 1971.

Chart performance

References

1971 singles
Hank Smith (singer) songs
1970 songs
Quality Records singles
Songs written by Dick Damron